Ricardo Menéndez can refer to:

 Ricardo Menéndez (1929-?), Salvadoran sports shooter
 Ricardo Menéndez (b. 1969), Venezuelan politician
 Ricardo Menéndez March, Mexican-born New Zealand activist and politician
 Ricardo Menéndez Salmón, Spanish novelist and writer